Hamood Abdullah Al Yazidi (born on May 28, 1988) is a Qatari footballer, who currently plays for Al-Markhiya.

Career
The midfielder left on 13 October 2010 his club Al-Sadd and joined on loan to Umm-Salal Sports Club.

International career
Al Yazidi played for Qatar at the 2005 FIFA U-17 World Championship in Peru.

References

External links 

Living people
Qatari footballers
Al Sadd SC players
1988 births
El Jaish SC players
Umm Salal SC players
Al-Khor SC players
Al-Wakrah SC players
Al-Markhiya SC players
Mesaimeer SC players
Qatar Stars League players
Qatari Second Division players
Association football fullbacks